(The Hermit) Op. 144a, is a composition for baritone soloist, five-part choir and orchestra by Max Reger, written in 1915. The German text is a poem by Joseph von Eichendorff, beginning "" (Come, consolation of the world, you quiet night).

History 
Reger composed the work in Jena, dating it 15 July 1915, setting a poem by Joseph von Eichendorff. He dedicated it to the Bach-Verein Heidelberg and its founder and conductor Philipp Wolfrum, writing "dem hochverehrlichen 'Bach-Verein Heidelberg' und seinem ausgezeichneten Dirigenten Herrn Geheimrat, Generalmusikdirektor, Professor Dr. Philipp Wolfrum" (to the praise-worthy 'Bach-Verein Heidelberg' and its excellent conductor, Geheimrat, Generalmusikdirektor, Professor Dr. Philipp Wolfrum).

Reger sent two works to the publisher , Der Einsiedler and Hebbel Requiem. He wrote to Simrock on : "I've finished two choral works (Der Einsiedler and Requiem). I think I can safely say that they're both among the most beautiful things I've ever written." ("Ich habe nun zwei Chorwerke (Der Einsiedler und Requiem) fertig. Reger himself had edited the piano version.

The Hebbel Requiem was first performed in Heidelberg on 16 July 1916, after the composer's death, as part of a memorial concert for Reger, with Rolf Ligniez, the choirs Bachverein and Akademischer Gesangverein, and the enlarged Städtisches Orchester (Municipal orchestra), conducted by Philipp Wolfrum.

Lyrics 
The German text is poem in three stanzas of six lines each by Joseph von Eichendorff. The poem was first published in 1837 in the anthology Deutscher Musenalmanach (German Musen-Almanach). The first stanza is based on the "Lied des Einsiedlers" (The hermit's song) from Grimmelshausens's Der Abentheuerliche Simplizissimus Teutsch (1669).

A solitary person, forgotten by the world, addresses the night as consolation, reflecting tiredness of day, desire and need, and expecting an eternal dawn. The poem was set to music by other composers, such as a Lied by Robert Schumann, Op. 83, No 3.

References

External links 
 
 Max Reger: Der 100. Psalm; Der Einsiedler; Requiem (Hebbel) AllMusic

Motets
Compositions by Max Reger
1915 compositions
Adaptations of works by Joseph von Eichendorff